Ophoven Airfield is an abandoned World War II military airfield  which is located west of Opglabbeek (Limburg); approximately  northeast of Brussels.

History
The airfield was built by the United States Army Air Forces IX Engineer Command, 820th Engineer Aviation Battalion in late November/early December 1944.

Known as Advanced Landing Ground "Y-32", the airfield consisted of a single 5000' (1500m) Pierced Steel Planking runway aligned 12/30. In addition, tents were erected for billeting and also for support facilities; an access road was built to the existing road infrastructure; a dump was created for supplies, ammunition, and gasoline drums, along with a drinkable water; and a minimal electrical grid for communications and station lighting was installed.

Opened on 10 December, the airfield was first used as a resupply and casualty evacuation airfield, with C-47 Skytrain transports flying in and out of the airfield frequently.  Combat units did not arrive at the airfield until late January 1945, when the  370th Fighter Group, based P-47 Thunderbolt fighters at Ophoven on 27 January.  In February, the 405th Fighter Group also based P-47s at the airfield.   The fighter planes flew support missions, patrolling roads in front of the beachhead; strafing German military vehicles and dropping bombs on gun emplacements, anti-aircraft artillery and concentrations of German troops when spotted.

Both groups moved out at the end of April 1945, the airfield closed about a month later at the end of May.  Today, the airfield is abandoned, being a mixture of agricultural fields just to the west of Ophoven.

See also

References

External links

Airfields of the United States Army Air Forces in Belgium
Defunct airports in Belgium
Airports established in 1944
Airports in Limburg (Belgium)